Selkirkiella is a genus of South American comb-footed spiders that was first described by Lucien Berland in 1924. Originally placed with the Araneidae, it was transferred to the comb-footed spiders in 1972.

Species
 it contains eight species, found in Chile, Argentina, and on the Falkland Islands:
Selkirkiella alboguttata Berland, 1924 (type) – Chile (Juan Fernandez Is.)
Selkirkiella carelmapuensis (Levi, 1963) – Chile
Selkirkiella luisi (Levi, 1967) – Chile
Selkirkiella magallanes (Levi, 1963) – Chile
Selkirkiella michaelseni (Simon, 1902) – Chile
Selkirkiella purpurea (Nicolet, 1849) – Chile
Selkirkiella ventrosa (Nicolet, 1849) – Chile, Argentina, Falkland Is.
Selkirkiella wellingtoni (Levi, 1967) – Chile

In synonymy:
S. portazuelo (Levi, 1967) = Selkirkiella alboguttata Berland, 1924
S. recurvata (Tullgren, 1901) = Selkirkiella ventrosa (Nicolet, 1849)
S. transversa (Nicolet, 1849) = Selkirkiella purpurea (Nicolet, 1849)
S. triangulifer (Simon, 1902) = Selkirkiella ventrosa (Nicolet, 1849)

See also
 List of Theridiidae species

References

Further reading

External links

Araneomorphae genera
Taxa named by Lucien Berland
Theridiidae